Kristen Rasmussen (born November 1, 1978) is an American former professional basketball player in the WNBA, also playing for CSS LMK BC Sepsi of Sfântu Gheorghe, Romania.

Born in Lansing, Michigan, Rasmussen attended college at Michigan State University and graduated in 2000. While playing for the Spartans, Rasmussen set the school record for blocked shots with 194.  She averaged 12.7 points and 8.2 rebounds per game in her career.

Following her college days, Rasmussen was drafted in the 4th round (51st Overall) in the 2000 WNBA Draft by the Utah Starzz. She appeared in just 1 game with Utah before being released and signed by the Miami Sol, where she remained through the 2002 season.

A well-traveled player, Rasmussen suited up for the Indiana Fever from 2003 to 2004 and the Houston Comets in 2005.  She was traded to the Charlotte Sting on August 1, 2005 along with Adrienne Goodson and a 1st round pick for Dawn Staley and a 2nd round pick.

Rasmussen joined the Phoenix Mercury for the 2006 season and signed as a free agent with the Connecticut Sun in 2007. On March 14, 2008, the Lynx acquired her for Tamika Williams. She moved in Athens, Greece, to play for the Greek club Panathinaikos for the 2008–09 season.

She is currently the Girl's Varsity Basketball coach for her alma mater, Okemos High School.

WNBA career statistics

Regular season

|-
| align="left" | 2000
| align="left" | Utah
| 1 || 0 || 9.0 || .000 || .000 || .000 || 2.0 || 1.0 || 1.0 || 0.0 || 1.0 || 0.0
|-
| align="left" | 2000
| align="left" | Miami
| 25 || 7 || 18.2 || .350 || .286 || .844 || 3.8 || 1.1 || 1.0 || 0.6 || 1.2 || 5.0
|-
| align="left" | 2001
| align="left" | Miami
| 28 || 3 || 14.9 || .360 || .250 || .750 || 3.1 || 0.6 || 0.4 || 0.5 || 1.1 || 2.7
|-
| align="left" | 2002
| align="left" | Miami
| 31 || 5 || 21.7 || .552 || .429 || .848 || 3.8 || 1.3 || 0.6 || 0.5 || 1.2 || 5.5
|-
| align="left" | 2003
| align="left" | Indiana
| 33 || 25 || 24.7 || .470 || .467 || .795 || 3.5 || 1.9 || 0.7 || 0.5 || 1.5 || 6.8
|-
| align="left" | 2004
| align="left" | Indiana
| 33 || 4 || 21.0 || .415 || .370 || .789 || 3.4 || 1.4 || 0.6 || 0.4 || 1.1 || 4.6
|-
| align="left" | 2005
| align="left" | Houston
| 24 || 19 || 21.8 || .480 || .333 || .733 || 3.2 || 0.9 || 0.5 || 0.7 || 0.8 || 5.0
|-
| align="left" | 2005
| align="left" | Charlotte
| 3 || 0 || 9.7 || .500 || .667 || .000 || 1.7 || 0.7 || 0.3 || 0.0 || 0.3 || 2.0
|-
| align="left" | 2006
| align="left" | Phoenix
| 34 || 32 || 26.7 || .512 || .429 || .600 || 6.1 || 2.1 || 0.8 || 0.8 || 1.0 || 4.3
|-
| align="left" | 2007
| align="left" | Connecticut
| 33 || 3 || 15.8 || .414 || .556 || .810 || 2.8 || 0.9 || 0.3 || 0.2 || 1.1 || 3.5
|-
| align="left" | 2008
| align="left" | Minnesota
| 31 || 0 || 12.7 || .375 || .348 || .739 || 2.7 || 0.9 || 0.4 || 0.2 || 0.6 || 2.5
|-
| align="left" | Career
| align="left" | 9 years, 8 teams
| 276 || 98 || 19.7 || .445 || .415 || .788 || 3.6 || 1.3 || 0.6 || 0.5 || 1.0 || 4.4

Playoffs

|-
| align="left" | 2000
| align="left" | Miami
| 3 || 0 || 7.7 || .000 || .000 || .500 || 2.0 || 0.0 || 0.3 || 0.0 || 2.0 || 0.3
|-
| align="left" | 2007
| align="left" | Connecticut
| 2 || 0 || 19.0 || .600 || .000 || .000 || 2.0 || 1.0 || 0.5 || 0.5 || 0.0 || 6.0
|-
| align="left" | Career
| align="left" | 2 years, 2 teams
| 5 || 0 || 12.2 || .400 || .000 || .500 || 2.0 || 0.4 || 0.4 || 0.2 || 1.2 || 2.6

Michigan State statistics
Source

Personal
Rasmussen is married to Australian Jamie Tarr whom she met in Zaragoza, Spain in 2005 .

References

External links
Rasmussen & Tarr: From "G'Day" to "I do" (Minnesota Public Radio)

1978 births
Living people
American expatriate basketball people in Australia
American expatriate basketball people in Greece
American expatriate basketball people in Romania
American women's basketball players
American women's basketball coaches
Basketball players from Michigan
Adelaide Lightning players
Charlotte Sting players
Connecticut Sun players
Houston Comets players
Indiana Fever players
Miami Sol players
Michigan State Spartans women's basketball players
Minnesota Lynx players
Panathinaikos WBC players
Sportspeople from Okemos, Michigan
Phoenix Mercury players
Sportspeople from Lansing, Michigan
Utah Starzz draft picks
Utah Starzz players
Centers (basketball)